Brathinus is a genus of rove beetles in the family Staphylinidae. There are at least three described species in Brathinus.

Species
 Brathinus nitidus LeConte, 1852
 Brathinus satoi Kishimoto & Shimada, 2003
 Brathinus varicornis

References

Further reading

 
 
 
 
 
 
 
 
 

Staphylinidae
Staphylinidae genera